Self-help, in the sense of a legal doctrine, refers to individuals' implementation of their rights without resorting to legal writ or consultation of higher authority, as where a financial institution repossesses a car on which they hold both the title and a defaulted note. Individuals resort to self-help when they retrieve property found under the unauthorized control of another person, or simply abate nuisances (as by using sandbags and ditches to protect land from being flooded). A self-help eviction refers to a commercial landlord's common law right to use self-help to reenter his or her property peaceably in order to evict a defaulting tenant or other person with no right of possession.

Degrees of limitation
The legal system places varying degrees of limitation on self-help, and laws vary widely among different jurisdictions. Often, self-help will be allowed as long as no law is broken, and no breach of the peace occurs (or is likely to occur).  Also, the usual limit on liability for actions of an agent will not apply; if one uses an agent such as an independent contractor to perform the self-help action, the principal will be held strictly liable if anything goes wrong. Courts will often place stricter limits on repossession of certain types of merchandise and on eviction of tenants. Creditors and landlords who resort to self-help in such situations are prone to tort liability, and in some jurisdictions, to criminal liability.

MBank El Paso v. Sanchez
A famous case, MBank El Paso v. Sanchez 836 S.W.2d 151 (Tex. 1992), was heard by the Texas Supreme Court.  Sanchez was the registered owner of a vehicle which MBank El Paso was lienholder.  When a tow truck operator hired by the bank attempted to repossess the vehicle, Sanchez locked herself in the car.  The tow truck operator hooked the car up to the tow truck anyway, and proceeded to drive it, with Sanchez still in the vehicle, at high speed to the lot where it was left, protected by a junkyard dog.  It required the combined efforts of Sanchez' boyfriend and the police to allow her to escape the impound lot.  In a subsequent trial, the repossession was declared unlawful and reversed, and the bank was also held liable for $1,250,000 in damages to Sanchez, even though the unlawful eviction was taken by the tow truck operator, who was not an employee of the bank.  The bank was held to a "non-delegatable duty not to breach the peace," and that any breach of the peace – whether by the debtor, the creditor, or even an independent contractor merely acting on behalf of the creditor – is considered the fault of the creditor.

Lack of judicial remedy
In a looser sense, self-help can also refer to individuals taking the law into their own hands, usually through violence or other illegal behavior. It can lead to factions forming around the disputing parties and also to broad civil conflict.

Historically, self-help has been regarded as the recourse for injured parties when no courts are available that will accept jurisdiction. The dangers of self-help are often advanced as an argument against allowing a situation to develop in which people feel they have no judicial path to a remedy, or that the courts are too corrupt to render just decisions, and as the main reason why impartial courts are established in the first place.

California has recognized the dangers of self-help evictions by landlords, in which tenants, landlords, and innocent bystanders might be injured or killed as a result of a self-help eviction. Due to the heavy case loads courts have, civil litigants can be required to wait months or years for a trial date. The State of California gives landlord-tenant cases priority over all other cases except for criminal trials and trials where the plaintiff or defendant is over 70 years of age.

United States v. Alvarez-Machain
One of the more famous examples of self-help occurred when, after Enrique Camarena Salazar, a Drug Enforcement agent, was murdered in Mexico in 1985, the U.S. Government hired mercenaries to kidnap Humberto Álvarez Machaín, a local doctor who was suspected of being involved in the murder, and bring him out of Mexico to face trial in the United States without going through the formality of demanding extradition from the Mexican government.  The original trial court was of the opinion that such action was illegal.  The United States Supreme Court decided that the self-help extradition of Machain from Mexico was legal, notwithstanding the existence of a treaty covering extradition between the U.S. and Mexico.  United States v. Alvarez-Machain,  504 U.S. 655, 657 (1992).  In the subsequent trial, Machain was acquitted.

See also
Repair and deduct, a related principle within the context of landlord–tenant law

References
 
 
 
 

Legal terminology
Landlord–tenant law

nl:Eigenrichting